Simandeep Singh (born 20 June 1995) is a Hong Kong cricketer. He made his List A debut for Hong Kong against Nepal in the 2018 Cricket World Cup Qualifier on 12 March 2018. He made his One Day International (ODI) debut for Hong Kong against Papua New Guinea in the World Cup Qualifier tournament's ninth place playoff match on 17 March 2018.

In September 2019, he was named in Hong Kong's squad for the 2019 ICC T20 World Cup Qualifier tournament in the United Arab Emirates. He made his Twenty20 International (T20I) debut for Hong Kong, against Ireland, on 18 October 2019.

References

External links
 

1995 births
Living people
Hong Kong cricketers
Hong Kong One Day International cricketers
Hong Kong Twenty20 International cricketers
Place of birth missing (living people)